The Peacemaker is a 1956 American Western film directed by Ted Post and starring James Mitchell and Rosemarie Bowe. Hal Richards based the script on the novel of the same name by Richard Poole.

Producer Hal R. Makelim intended The Peacemaker to be the first of a series of low-budget productions. According to Merlin, who played the villain, shooting took only "seven or ten days."

Although the film featured some successful character actors like Hugh Sanders in supporting roles, none of the performers qualified as marquee names; in fact, at this point in his career, star James Mitchell was known only as a dancer (despite some dramatic roles at MGM). While Makelim tried to compensate for these problems by marketing the film to a religious audience—the local clergymen were invited to the film's premiere in Wichita--The Peacemaker enjoyed only sporadic distribution and was not widely reviewed.  Makelim managed to produce only one more film, Valerie (1957), and Mitchell would not make another film appearance until The Turning Point (1977).

Plot
A former gunfighter who went to prison but then took up religion arrives in a western town as the new preacher. There he finds a feud between the ranchers and the farmers. The Railroad Agent is after the ranchers land and has his men causing all the trouble. The new preacher sets out to bring the two sides together and he says he will not need a gun.

Cast
 James Mitchell as Terrall Butler
 Rosemarie Stack as Ann Davis (as Rosemarie Bowe)
 Jan Merlin as Viggo Tomlin
 Jess Barker as Ed Halcomb
 Hugh Sanders as Lathe Sawyer
 Herbert Patterson as Gray Arnett
 Dorothy Patrick as Edith Sawyer
 Taylor Holmes as Mr. Wren
 Robert Armstrong as Sheriff Ben Seale
 Philip Tonge as Elijah Maddox
 David McMahon as Sam Davis
 Wheaton Chambers as Doc Runyan
 Jack Holland as Walt Kemper
 Nancy Evans as Miss Smith 
 Harry Shannon as Drunken Cowpuncher

See also
 List of American films of 1956

References

External links

1956 Western (genre) films
1956 films
American black-and-white films
Films directed by Ted Post
American Western (genre) films
1950s English-language films
1950s American films